Kieran Dixon (born 22 August 1992) is an English professional rugby league footballer who plays as er or  for the Widnes Vikings in the Betfred Championship and the England Knights at international level.

He has played for the London Broncos in the Super League and in the Championship, and on loan from the Broncos at the Hemel Stags in League 1. He also played for Hull Kingston Rovers in the Super League.

Background
Dixon was born in Hackney, London, England. Dixon grew up in Hemel Hempstead and attended Cavendish school.

Playing career

London Broncos
Kieran Dixon made his début for the London Broncos in the 24-34 defeat by St Helens in the Super League match at Twickenham Stoop on 4 February 2012.

He scored his first try against Wakefield Trinity Wildcats at the Twickenham Stoop in a 36-0 win.

He suffered a career threatening injury whilst on international duty in 2013, and returned to first team action towards the end of the 2014 Super League season, with the Broncos relegation from the top flight long since confirmed.

Hemel Stags
Dixon was loaned to the Hemel Stags in a bid to regain fitness on his return to first team with the Broncos.

Hull Kingston Rovers
After a serious injury ruled him out for the most of the 2014 season, Dixon joined Hull Kingston Rovers in 2015. He appeared for Rovers in the 2015 Challenge Cup final, however his performance in the match was heavily criticised as the team suffered a record-breaking 50-0 defeat by Leeds. The following week, Dixon bounced back to score two tries in a man-of-the-match display as Hull Kingston Rovers beat Wakefield Trinity. And on 12th 09-15 went 2 better with yet another man of the match performance and 4 tries against Bradford Bulls in a match that made sure Rovers secured Super league status for the next season.

Newcastle Thunder
Dixon played one game on loan for the Newcastle Thunder in RFL League 1, scoring a try against the London Skolars in May 2016.

Return to London
Dixon re-signed for the London Broncos after Hull Kingston Rovers were relegated from the Super League, taking up the offer to return to his home club for the 2017 and 2018 seasons.

Dixon was the top try scorer for the club in 2018, with 26 tries to his name. The club was promoted back to Super League after victory in the "Million Pound game" away in Toronto.

In 2019 London were relegated from the Super League on points difference, with Dixon topping the goal and point scoring record for the Broncos for their 2019 season.

Dixon again topped the goal and point scoring record for London, in their shortened season that was affected by the global pandemic.

York City Knights
On 17 November 2020 it was announced that Dixon would join the York City Knights from the 2021 season.

Widnes Vikings
On 23 June 2022 it was announced that both he and Luis Roberts would join the Widnes Vikings on loan for the remainder of the 2022 season. In October 2022 Dixon made his move permanent with a two-year deal.

International
Dixon played at representative level with the England Knights.

He sustained a career threatening injury in 2013 against Samoa.

Club statistics

References

External links

London Broncos profile
SL profile
Harlequins RL hand Kieran Dixon a two-year contract

1992 births
Living people
England Knights national rugby league team players
English rugby league players
Hemel Stags players
Hull Kingston Rovers players
Leigh Leopards players
London Broncos players
People from the London Borough of Hackney
Rochdale Hornets players
Rugby league fullbacks
Rugby league players from London
Rugby league wingers
Widnes Vikings players
York City Knights players